The national federations of the UCI form confederations by continent. In the Americas, this body is the Confederación Panamericana de Ciclismo (the Pan American Cycling Confederation), also shortened to COPACI. COPACI was founded in 1922 in Montevideo and is presently headquartered in Havana.

COPACI serves as the sponsor of the annual Pan American Road and Track Championships and a key organisation for the UCI America Tour.

Member Federations 

As of June 2021, COPACI consists of 44 full member federations and 5 associate member federations. One of its members, the Mexican Cycling Federation, is currently suspended from the UCI.

Full members

Associate members

Former members 

Following the dissolution of the Netherlands Antilles in 2010, its cycling federation was also disbanded and replaced with those of the three Caribbean member countries of the Kingdom of the Netherlands (Aruba, Curaçao, and Sint Maarten).

References

External links
 COPACI official website

Cycle racing organizations
Union Cycliste Internationale
Sports governing bodies in North America
Sports governing bodies in South America
Pan-American sports governing bodies